This is a list of amphibians and reptiles found in the British overseas territory of Montserrat, located in the Caribbean Lesser Antilles.  The continuing eruptions of the Soufrière Hills volcano have devastated much of the island.

Amphibians
There are three species of amphibian on Montserrat, one of which was introduced.

Frogs (Anura)

Reptiles
Including marine turtles and introduced species, there are 15 reptile species reported on Montserrat.  Two are endemic: the Plymouth Anole (Anolis lividus) and the Montiserrat Galliwasp (Diploglossus montisserrati).

Turtles (Testudines)

Lizards and snakes (Squamata)

Notes

References
Note: All species listed above are supported by Malhotra & Thorpe 1999, unless otherwise cited.

.

 Amphibians
Montserrat
Montserrat
 Montserrat
 Montserrat
Amphibians and reptiles